Stephen Antonakos (November 1, 1926 in Agios Nikolaos, Laconia, Greece – August 17, 2013 in New York City) was a Greek born American sculptor most well known for his abstract sculptures often incorporating neon.

Life and works
Antonakos moved with his family from Greece to the United States at the age of 4 and was raised in the Brooklyn, New York neighborhood of Bay Ridge.

Antonakos' work has been included in several important international exhibitions including Documenta 6 in 1977 in Kassel, Germany and he represented Greece at the Venice Biennale in 1997.  His art is included in major international collections including the Metropolitan Museum of Art, The Museum of Modern Art, The Whitney Museum of American Art, The Solomon R. Guggenheim Museum, all in New York City, The National Gallery of Art in Washington D.C., The Hyde Collection in Glens Falls, NY, and the National Museum of Contemporary Art, Athens.  Among his public commissions were pieces for airports in Atlanta, Milwaukee, and Bari, Italy and two high-profile works in New York City, "Neon for 42nd Street" (since taken down) and the "59th street piece- Neon for the 59th street transfer station"(still standing). His large-scale neon installation, Proscenium (2000), was on view from January 28-June 24, 2018, at the Neuberger Museum of Art, SUNY Purchase.

Antonakos was a member of the National Academy of Design and received their lifetime achievement award in 2011.

Selected exhibitions

 2020: A Space Full of Drawings and a Drawing in Space, Daniel Marzona, Berlin, Germany
 2017: documenta 14, Kassel, Germany
 2012: Neon, la materia luminosa dell’arte, MACRO Museo d’Arte Contemporanea di Roma, Rome, Italy
 2009: In and Out of Amsterdam: art & project, Museum of Modern Art, New York, NY, USA
 2007: The Abstract Impulse: Fifty Years of Abstraction at the National Academy 1956 – 2006, National Academy Museum and School, NY, USA
 2005: Drawings, Neue Nationalgalerie, Berlin, Germany
 2002: Adventure of Medias;  Sound, Light, and Image, Kamakura Gallery, Kanagawa, Japan
 2002: Probation Area: Arte Povera, Conceptual Art, Minimal Art, Land Art: The Marzona Collection, Hamburger Bahnhof, Berlin, Germany
 2001: Im Spiegel der Freiheit: Giannis Tsarouchis, Stephen Antonakos, George Hadjimichalis, Schirn Kunsthalle Frankfurt Frankfurt am Main, Curator:  Hellmut Seemann
 2000: (e così via) (and so on): 99 Artist from the Marzona Collection: arte povera, minimal art, land art, Galleria Comunale d'Arte Contemporanea, Rome, Italy
 1999: Antonakos: „Welcome“ and „Chapel for P.S. 1“, MoMA PS1, New York City
 1997: Chapel of the Heavenly Ladder, 47th International Art Exhibition Venice Biennale, Biennale di Venezia, Venice, Italy
 1989: ARTEC, 1st International Biennale, Nagoya, Japan
 1987: Mathematik in der Kunst der Letzten Dreissig Jahre, Wilhelm-Hack-Museum, Ludwigshafen am Rhein, Curator: Bernhard Holedzek
 1977: documenta 6, Kassel, Curator: Manfred Schneckenburger
 1975: USA Zeichnungen 3, Schloss Morsbroich, Leverkusen, Curator: Rolf Wedewer und Rolf Ricke
 1975: Eight Artists, Eight Attitudes, Eight Greeks, Institute of Contemporary Arts, London, UK
 1973: Works in Spaces, San Francisco Museum of Modern Art, San Francisco, CA, USA
 1973: American Drawings, Whitney Museum of American Art, New York City, Curator: Elke M. Solomon
 1970: Preliminary Drawings, Museum of Modern Art, New York, NY, USA
 1966: Kunst-Light-Kunst, Van Abbemuseum, Eindhoven, Curator: Jean Leering

References

External links
The artist's website
Daniel Marzona Gallery, Berlin: Stephen Antonakos

Neon artists
1926 births
2013 deaths
Greek emigrants to the United States
People from Laconia
People from Bay Ridge, Brooklyn
Artists from New York City
Greek contemporary artists
Sculptors from New York (state)